The following highways are numbered 651:

Canada
Alberta Highway 651
 Ontario Highway 651
Saskatchewan Highway 651

Israel
Route 651 (Israel)

United States
 
 
 
 
 Local Route 651, Lobbs Shop Road, Sussex County, Virginia